The 2014 Ipswich Borough Council election took place on 22 May 2014 to elect members of Ipswich Borough Council in England. This was on the same day as other local elections.

After the election, the composition of the council was:

Labour 35
Conservative 10
Liberal Democrat 3

Results

Alexandra

Bixley

Bridge

Castle Hill

Gainsborough

Gipping

Holywells

Priory Heath

Rushmere

References

2014 English local elections
2014
2010s in Suffolk